Antoine d'Agata (born 1961) is a French photographer and film director. His work deals with topics that are often considered taboo, such as addiction, sex, personal obsessions, darkness, and prostitution.

D'Agata is a full member of Magnum Photos. In 2001 he won the Niépce Prize for young photographers.

Life and work
D'Agata was born in Marseille in 1961. He left France in 1983 to start a series of travels. He studied photography at the International Center of Photography in New York City in 1990, under the tutelage of Larry Clark and Nan Goldin.

D'Agata's work deals with addiction, sex, personal obsessions, darkness, prostitution, and other topics widely considered taboo. He often uses his own life experiences as source material. "My intimacy is linked so much to my work, and my work depends so much on my intimate experiences of the world. It's all intermingled."

D'Agata has been a full member of Magnum Photos since 2008. He has published more than a dozen books and three films.

In 2009 Tommaso Lusena and Giuseppe Schillaci released a documentary film about d'Agata called The Cambodian Room: Situations with Antoine d'Agata.

Publications

Publications by d'Agata
Mala Noche. France: En Vue, 1998.
De Mala Muerte. Paris: , 1998.
Hometown. Paris: Le Point du Jour Editeur, 2001.
Antoine d'Agata. Spain: Centro de Estudios Fotograficos, 2001.
Insomnia. Marseille: Images en Manoeuvre, 2003.
Vortex. France: Atlantica, 2003.
La Ville sans Nom. Paris: Le Point du Jour Editeur, 2004.
Stigma. Marseille: Images en Manoeuvre, 2004. . With a text by Philippe Azoury.
Manifeste. Cherbourg-Octeville (Manche): Le Point du Jour Editeur, 2005. .
Psychogéographie. Paris: Le Point du Jour Editeur, 2005. . With texts by d'Agata and Bruno Le Dantec.
Agonie. Arles: Actes Sud/Atelier de Visu, 2009.  Text by Rafael Garido. 
Ice. Images En Manœuvres, 2011. .
Position(s). Avarie, 2012, . 
Paraiso. France: Andre Frere, 2013.  
Anticorps. Madrid: Xavier Barral; Paris: Le Bal, 2013. . Catalogue for retrospective exhibition at Le Bal in Paris. Text in French.
Antibodies. Munich: Prestel, 2014. . With a text by d'Agata translated into English.
Fukushima. Tokyo: Super Labo, 2015. Text in English and Japanese. Edition of 500 copies.
AiTHO. Roquevaire, France: Andre Frere, 2015. Text in French. Edition of 300 copies.
Index. Roquevaire, France: Andre Frere, 2015. .
Cidade de Pedra. Athens: Void, 2016. 
Codex – Mexico 1986–2007. Mexico: Editorial RM, 2016.
Lilith. 64P series. Madrid: La Fábrica, 2017. . Text in English and Spanish.
Self-Portraits: 1987–2017. Tokyo: Super Labo, 2017. Edition of 1000 copies.
Oscurana. Athens: Void, 2018. 
Acéphale. Arles: Studio Vortex, 2018.
Stasis. Arles. Studio Vortex, 2019.

Publications paired with another
Aïda Mady Diallo. Les Carnets de la Creation series. Montreuil, Paris: l'Oeil, 2003. . A short story by Aïda Mady Diallo with photographs from Mali by d'Agata. In French.

Publications with contributions by d'Agata
Home. Tokyo: Magnum Photos Tokyo, 2018. .
Hunger. Athens: Void, 2018. .

Films
Le Ventre du Monde = The World's Belly (2004)
El Cielo del Muerto (2005) – documentary short
Aka Ana (2008)
Atlas (2012)
White Noise (2019)

Exhibitions
1001 Nuits, Paris, 2004.
Antoine D'Agata: Anticorps, Fotomuseum Den Haag, 26 May – 2 September 2012; Le Bal, Paris, 24 January – 14 April 2013; Spazio Forma, Milan, 27 June – 1 September 2013; and Atsukobarouh, Tokyo, 23 May – 6 July 2015.

Awards
2001: Niépce Prize, Association , Paris
2004: Overseas Photographer Prize, Higashikawa Prize, Japan
2013: Rencontres d'Arles Author's Book Award, Arles, France, for Anticorps (2013)

References

External links
D'Agata at Magnum Photos
Overview of Antoine D'Agata's work at documentsdartistes.org
Antoine D'Agata on Facebook

Antoine d'Agata: "Empty Shell Walking" By Doug Rickard at American Suburb X
Interview with Antoine d'Agata
Interview with Antoine d'Agata on GUP Magazine (2012)
Antoine d’Agata: Your Dishonesty is the Codex for My Vitriol By Brad Feuerhelm at American Suburb X

1961 births
Living people
Mass media people from Marseille
French film directors
French photographers
Magnum photographers